The 1992 Mountain Dew Southern 500 was the 21st stock car race of the 1992 NASCAR Winston Cup Series season and the 43rd iteration of the event. The race was held on Sunday, September 6, 1992, before an audience of 70,000 in Darlington, South Carolina, at Darlington Raceway, a  permanent egg-shaped oval racetrack. The race was shortened from its scheduled 367 laps to 293 due to rain. In the final laps of the race, owner-driver Darrell Waltrip and his team decided to pit for fuel only on the final pit stop, contrary to most, who had pitted for tires and fuel. With a shorter pit stop, he was able to lead the final six laps before the red flag was put out to stop the race, with NASCAR officials deciding to end the race early, handing Waltrip the victory. The victory was Waltrip's 84th and final career NASCAR Winston Cup Series victory and his third and final victory of the season. To fill out the top three, Roush Racing driver Mark Martin and Junior Johnson & Associates driver Bill Elliott would finish second and third, respectively.

Background 

Darlington Raceway is a race track built for NASCAR racing located near Darlington, South Carolina. It is nicknamed "The Lady in Black" and "The Track Too Tough to Tame" by many NASCAR fans and drivers and advertised as "A NASCAR Tradition." It is of a unique, somewhat egg-shaped design, an oval with the ends of very different configurations, a condition which supposedly arose from the proximity of one end of the track to a minnow pond the owner refused to relocate. This situation makes it very challenging for the crews to set up their cars' handling in a way that is effective at both ends.

Entry list 

 (R) denotes rookie driver.

Qualifying 
Qualifying was split into two rounds. The first round was held on Friday, September 4, at 3:00 PM EST. Each driver would have one lap to set a time. During the first round, the top 20 drivers in the round would be guaranteed a starting spot in the race. If a driver was not able to guarantee a spot in the first round, they had the option to scrub their time from the first round and try and run a faster lap time in a second round qualifying run, held on Saturday, September 5, at 11:30 AM EST. As with the first round, each driver would have one lap to set a time. For this specific race, positions 21-40 would be decided on time and depending on who needed it, a select amount of positions were given to cars who had not otherwise qualified but were high enough in owner's points; up to two provisionals were given. If needed, a past champion who did not qualify on either time or provisionals could use a champion's provisional, adding one more spot to the field.

No drivers would fail to qualify.

Full qualifying results

Race results

Standings after the race 

Drivers' Championship standings

Note: Only the first 10 positions are included for the driver standings.

References

Mountain Dew Southern 500
Mountain Dew Southern 500
Mountain Dew Southern 500
NASCAR races at Darlington Raceway